Nuno Saraiva (born 16 March 1994) is a Portuguese judoka, who competed at the 2016 Summer Olympics in the 73 kg category.

References

External links
 
 
 Nuno Saraiva profile  at Rio2016.com

1994 births
Judoka at the 2016 Summer Olympics
Living people
Olympic judoka of Portugal
Portuguese male judoka
Judoka at the 2019 European Games
European Games medalists in judo
European Games silver medalists for Portugal
20th-century Portuguese people
21st-century Portuguese people